"Danger" is a song by New Zealand singer songwriter Sharon O'Neill. The song was released in October 1983 as the third and final single from her fourth studio album, Foreign Affairs (1983). The song peaked at number 78 in Australia.

Track listing 
7" (BA 223116) 
Side A "Danger" – 4:06
Side B "Hearts on the Run" – 3:50

Charts

References 

1983 songs
1983 singles
Sharon O'Neill songs
Songs written by Sharon O'Neill
Rock ballads